Barton Premium  is a Kentucky Blended whiskey produced in Bardstown, Kentucky by the Sazerac Company at its Barton 1792 Distillery. It is sold in glass in 16 oz pint bottles, glass 750ml bottles, glass 1-liter bottles and plastic 1.75L bottles.

External links
 Official site for Barton Premium
 Official site for Barton Brands

References

Whiskies of the United States
Sazerac Company brands
Bardstown, Kentucky
American brands